Chitalu Chilufya  (born 15 July 1972) is a Zambian physician and politician. He is currently a Member of the National Assembly for Mansa Central. He was Minister of Health from August 2016 to January 2021.

Biography
Chilufya grew up in the Kaunda Square area of Lusaka. He studied medicine at the University of Zambia and worked as a physician. He was chosen as the Movement for Multi-Party Democracy candidate to contest the Mansa Central seat in the 2011 general elections. However, he was defeated by Kennedy Sakeni of the Patriotic Front. Sakeni died in 2013 and Chilufya was adopted as the Patriotic Front candidate for the subsequent by-election, despite the party having labelled him as a thief in the 2011 election campaign, and was elected to the National Assembly with an 8,392-vote majority.

In February 2015 he was appointed Deputy Minister of Health. After retaining his seat in the 2016 general elections and increasing his majority to over 22,000, he was promoted to Minister of Health.

Chilufya is married with two children.

References 

Living people
1972 births
People from Lusaka
University of Zambia alumni
Members of the National Assembly of Zambia
Zambian Christians
Zambian physicians
Health ministers of Zambia
Movement for Multi-Party Democracy politicians
Patriotic Front (Zambia) politicians